Today Is the Day is the third studio album by American noise rock band Today Is the Day. It was released on March 26, 1996 by Amphetamine Reptile Records. It was the band's only studio album to feature keyboardist Scott Wexton.

In 2008, a remastered version of the album containing two bonus tracks that originated from the Amphetamine Reptile Clusterfuck compilations was released through Steve Austin's SuperNova Records. A live performance DVD was released a year earlier. It was filmed during the tour for the self-titled album, titled Today Is the Day Live.

Track listing

Personnel
Adapted from the Today Is the Day liner notes.

Today Is the Day
Steve Austin – vocals, guitar, sampler, production, engineering
Brad Elrod – drums
Scott Wexton – synthesizer, sampler

Release history

References

External links 
 
 Today Is the Day at Bandcamp

1996 albums
Today Is the Day albums
Amphetamine Reptile Records albums